Andranik Hakobyan (born November 26, 1959, Madina, Martuni Region, ASSR) is an Armenian poet, publicist, statesman and public figure.

Biography
Andranik Hakobyan was born in the village of Madina of Martuni Region. He graduated from the secondary school N.1 of Artashat, afterwards the department of philosophy and sociology of Yerevan State University. Hakobyan taught history and social sciences in schools, worked as a school supervisor in Artashat District National Educational Department, later in AKP Ararat district commissariat. In 1991-1999 he served in the Armed Forces of Armenia, from 1999 to 2004 he worked in the Government of Armenia. From 2004 to 2008 he served in the Police of Armenia. Hakobyan is the Chief Adviser of the Minister of Emergency Situations of Armenia. He has been awarded with state medals, commemorative medals.
Hakobyan is the author of poems, short stories, essays, novelettes, journalistic publications.

Bibliography of works 
 “Alone against the wind” poems, 2001
 “Feeling hot” short stories, essays, 2004
 “The country with the blue sky” novelette, 2016
 “A talk with the mountain” short stories, essays, novelette, 2016
 “The rising sun” poems, 2017
 “A talk between three” memoirs written with Ashot 
 “Vardanyan as the co-author”, 2019

References about A. Hakobyan
 Roland Sharoyan   “The  poet who has saddled the stars” Azg, 3 April 2001
 Arevik Harutjunyan “Voice of anxiety and love”    Garun, N.4, 2001
 Tevos Petrosyan “Poets’ time” Grakan Tert, 1–15 May 2001
 Martin Gilavyan “Not in spite of but in the name of” Hajastani Hanrapetutjun, N.60, 04,07,2001
 Anahit Tadevosyan “Time creates words” Introductory notes and translation, Novaya Vremia, N.749, 19.05.2001
 Martin Gilavyan “Poetry and time motion” Yerevan, 2003, p. 153
 Nerses Atabekyan “The planet of  the strong  lonely”, “World of Geghama” 4 November 2004
 Naghash Martirosyan “ Feeling hot” an open letter for the reader” thoughts instead of review, Azg, 28 January 2005
 Felix Bakhchinyan “With  memories about the world of  Taron” Grakan Tert,  24,11,2006
 Nerses Atabekyan “Tempting like mountain climbing”
 Felix Bakhchinyan “Saga about family cult” Hraparak, 16 September 2016
 Vanush Shermazanyan “Secret code of our blood”, “Trial to decipher Andranik Hakobyan’s “Country with the blue sky” after reading it without a moment’s respite. On Facebook, 30 September 2016
 Felix Bakhchinyan “World of Andranik Hakobyan’s creations” Yerevan, 2017
 Petros Demirchyan “Memory the roots of which come from the depth” Grakan Tert, 3 November 2017
 Felix Bakhchinyan “The cross we have to bear” Yerevan, 2017
 Hovik Hoveyan “ Spacial charm of the nation’s silence “ Hraparak
 Arthur Andranikyan “Let’s uncover our face to our soul”  Irates de facto, 24 February 2018
 Grigor Janikyan “Our How and Why” 
 Hovhannes Ayvazyan “Mediations on Andranik Hakobyan’s “A talk with the mountain” and “The rising sun” collections, 2019

References

External links
 Չակերտներ․ Անդրանիկ Հակոբյան
 Andranik Hakobyan's poems on youtube

Armenian male poets
1959 births
Living people
People from Gegharkunik Province
Armenian male writers